Another Woman's Life is a 2012 international co-production comedy film directed by Sylvie Testud.

Cast 
 Juliette Binoche as Marie Speranski
 Mathieu Kassovitz as Paul Speranski
 Aure Atika as Jeanne
 Danièle Lebrun as Denise Bontant
 Vernon Dobtcheff as Dimitri Speranski
 Yvi Dachary-Le Béon as Adam Speranski
 François Berléand as Lawyer Volin
 Marie-Christine Adam as Babouchka Speranski
 Astrid Whettnall as Simono

References

External links 

2012 romantic comedy films
2012 films
French romantic comedy films
Belgian romantic comedy films
Luxembourgian romantic comedy films
Films based on French novels
Films about amnesia
2010s French-language films
2010s French films
French-language Belgian films